Little Bourke Street (abbreviated to Lt. Bourke St) in Melbourne's CBD runs roughly east–west within the Hoddle Grid. It is a one-way street heading in a westward direction. The street intersects with Spencer Street at its western end and Spring Street at its eastern end. Melbourne's Chinatown, which extends between the corners of Swanston and Exhibition Streets, is a major feature of the street. 

Major department stores Myer and David Jones along with upscale shopping centre Emporium Melbourne have entrances on Little Bourke Street with stores Coach, Michael Kors, Ted Baker, Mulberry and Furla within the centre having frontages onto Little Bourke between Swanston Street and Elizabeth Street. The back entrance of GPO Melbourne is also on this street. Higher-end restaurants are found on the stretch between Exhibition Street and Spring Street.

See also

Streets in Melbourne City Centre